Egil Gade Greve (born 11 February 1930) is a Norwegian banker. He was born in Bergen; the son of merchant Arent Wittendorph Greve and Anna Gade, and a brother of Tim Greve. He served as CEO of Bergen Bank from 1982, and when Bergen Bank merged with Den norske Creditbank in 1990, he became the first CEO of Den norske Bank, until his retirement in 1991. He was decorated Knight First Class of the Order of St. Olav in 1997, and is Commander of the Order of the Lion of Finland, and Commander of the Order of the Polar Star.

References

1930 births
Living people
Businesspeople from Bergen
Norwegian bankers
Commanders of the Order of the Lion of Finland
Commanders of the Order of the Polar Star